is a railway station on the Hokuriku Railroad Ishikawa Line in Hakusan, Ishikawa, Japan, operated by the private railway operator Hokuriku Railroad (Hokutetsu).

Lines

Station layout
The station consists of one side platform serving a single bi-directional track. The station is unattended.

Adjacent stations

History
Hinomiko Station opened on 5 September 1925.

Surrounding area
 Ishikawa Prefectural Route 179
 Ishikawa Prefectural Route 45
 
 Tsurugi Nikko Factory
 Tsurugi Rbcontrols Factory
 JA Hakusan Zoyama Branch
 Tsurugu Senior Living Center
 Hakusan Community Center
 Hinomiko Post Office
 Daianji Temple

See also
 List of railway stations in Japan

References

External links

  

Railway stations in Ishikawa Prefecture
Railway stations in Japan opened in 1925
Hokuriku Railroad Ishikawa Line
Hakusan, Ishikawa